The Training Centre for Science and Technology (CEPRECYT) is an institution for promoting science and technology in Peruvian society, whose objective is to encourage children and students to follow careers in science and technology and to promote science and technology applications.

International conferences 

CEPRECYT founded and co-organizes international science events including the International Meeting for Science and Technology (ECI), the International Course on Science and Technology for science teachers (CICTA), the International Scientific Seminar, the "Fiesta de la Ciencia", and workshops and seminars of science teaching.

References

External links 
 http://www.ceprecyt.org/
 https://web.archive.org/web/20090201022432/http://www.eciperu.org.pe/
 http://www.worldscientists.org/

, 
,

 

Science and technology in Peru
Scientific organisations based in Peru